Booky's Crush is a 2009 Canadian made for TV drama film directed by Peter Moss. The screenplay was written by Tracey Forbes and based upon the Bernice Thurman Hunter novels That Scatterbrain Booky, With Love From Booky, and As Ever, Booky.

Background
First announced in 2008, Booky's Crush is the third in a series of made-for-TV films about Beatrice 'Booky' Thomson, a little girl growing up in Toronto during the depression era.  Her parents are played by real-life husband and wife Megan Follows and Stuart Hughes.

The first in this series covered a timeframe when Booky was a teenager.  Booky Makes Her Mark (2006) starred Tatiana Maslany as Booky at 15 years old.  The subsequent films in the series, both Booky and the Secret Santa (2007) and Booky's Crush (2009), were set in an earlier timeframe, with Rachel Marcus starring as Booky at 11 years old.

Plot
The Thomsons are a working class family living in Toronto during the Great Depression.  Parents, Thomas Thomson (Stuart Hughes) and Francie Thomson (Megan Follows) struggle to provide for their children, Willa (Sarah White), Arthur (Dylan Everett), Beatrice (nicknamed Booky) (Rachel Marcus) and Jakey (Noah Ryan Scott).

11-year-old Beatrice 'Booky' Thomson is showing her strength in reading and spelling, and has been asked to tutor Georgie Dunlop (Connor Price), an older sixth grader. This thrills Booky, as she has a crush on Georgie and hopes he will ask her to a school dance.  But after Georgie gives her a strange gift, she begins to re-evaluate her feelings toward him.

Booky's older sister Willa Thomson, has a part-time job as a librarian.  While at work, Willa meets and is attracted to Russell (Marc Bendavid), a medical student.  With her senior year in high school beginning, and even though she knows her family cannot afford it, Willa gives thought toward attending medical school after she graduates.

Arthur has an artistic aptitude, and though his parents are supportive of his dreams, his father encourages him to consider a more stable profession, which places a strain on their father-son relationship.

Booky goes to the dance with Georgie. He turns up late and surprises her. He kisses her and that's all she talks about.

Cast

Recognition
Maria Kubacki, of the Calgary Sun notes that modern audiences can relate to the hardships faced in the 1930s when she writes "Booky's Crush might have been conceived as a nostalgia piece far removed from modern reality but given the current economic meltdown, CBC's Depression-era family drama suddenly seems strangely relevant."

Accolades
 2009, Directors Guild of Canada nomination for 'DGC Team Award'
 2009, Gemini Awards nomination for Dylan Everett for 'Best Performance by an Actor in a Featured Supporting Role in a Dramatic Program or Mini-Series'
 2009, Gemini Awards nomination for Stuart Hughes for 'Best Performance by an Actor in a Featured Supporting Role in a Dramatic Program or Mini-Series'
 2009, Gemini Awards nomination for Rachel Marcus for 'Best Performance by an Actress in a Leading Role in a Dramatic Program or Mini-Series'
 2009, Gemini Awards nomination for Aidan Leroux, for 'Best Production Design or Art Direction in a Fiction Program or Series'

See also
 2009 in film
 Cinema of Canada
 List of Canadian films of 2009

References

External links

2009 drama films
2009 television films
2009 films
Canadian drama television films
CBC Television original films
English-language Canadian films
2000s Canadian films
2000s English-language films